Hugo Prono (23 February 1923 – 6 January 1970) was an Argentine former water polo player who competed in the 1948 Summer Olympics.

References

External links
 

1923 births
1970 deaths
Argentine male water polo players
Olympic water polo players of Argentina
Water polo players at the 1948 Summer Olympics